The Fonderia Nebiolo was a manufacturer of printing presses and paper and formerly a type foundry. Nebiolo & Co. was created in 1878 when Giovanni Nebiolo bought out the type foundry of G. Narizzano in Turin, Italy, in 1852. In 1908 the company merged with the Urania Company and operated under the name Augustea and began to buy out many smaller foundries. In 1916 it was again renamed Società Nebiolo.  In 1976 in occasion of the renovation of the Company that naturally would have come to an end that year, Fiat entered into the press manufacturing business and the Studio Artistico was closed up. In 1992 it became Nebiolo Printech S.p.A. and continues to manufacture presses under that name today.

Type foundry 
The Fonderia Nebiolo (Nebiolo Type Foundry) was part of a larger manufacturing organisation including: 

Its output fulfilled the requirements of Nebiolo press manufacture, besides supplying substantial quantities of castings to important Italian and foreign concerns;

The Fonderia Nebiolo was originally founded in Turin in 1852 by a craftsman as a private concern, it was made into a Limited Company in 1880. 

The reason why the Fonderia Nebiolo could be considered so unique is that in 1933 it was created, by Raffaello Bertieri, an internal Studio Artistico (Artistic Study) made of experts in type designing. It was run originally by Giulio Da Milano, then by Alessandro Butti and from 1952 by Aldo Novarese, the Italian most important type designer.

In the 60’s attempting to satisfy the changing of the print market the Fonderia Nebiolo established several different commercial collaborations: with Reber R41 as commercial partner in the distribution of its fonts as dry transfers and as exclusive distributor for the Italian Market of the typesetting machines of the Compugrahic Society

In 1976 Fiat entered into the Foundry with the aim to run exclusively the Industrial part: the Studio Artistico was then closed and its fonts got under various trade agreements to selected partners:  Reber R41 owns the larger authentic fonts collection of The Nebiolo Foundry in the world, based exclusively on the original drawings.

Type faces

Printing presses
In 1890 Nebiolo began manufacturing printing presses, at first letterpress, but today the company produces the Colora line of sheet-fed offset presses, the Target line of web offset presses, a line of flexo packaging presses, and the Nebiolo Orient, a newspaper web-press.

Paper
May 2001 Nebiolo acquired the Arbatax papermill, which produces 20% of Italy’s paper, with a yearly production of 130.000 tons of recycled paper for newsprint.

References

Jaspert, W. Pincus, W. Turner Berry and A.F. Johnson. The Encyclopedia of Type Faces. Blandford Press Lts.: 1953, 1983. .
Friedl, Ott, and Stein, Typography: an Encyclopedic Survey of Type Design and Techniques Throughout History. Black Dog & Levinthal Publishers: 1998. .

Further links 
The story of Nebiolo

Nebiolo History Project
Letterpress font foundries
Printing press manufacturers
Manufacturing companies established in 1852
Manufacturing companies based in Turin
Italian brands
Henokiens companies
1852 establishments in the Kingdom of Sardinia
Italian companies established in 1852
Metal companies of Italy